Christy Condon (born 23 October 1981) is an Irish former rugby union player.

Munster
Condon joined the Munster set-up on a training contract at the start of the 2011–12 season, and secured a development contract for the 2012–13 season.

He represented Munster A during their victorious 2011–12 British and Irish Cup campaign. It was announced on 14 May 2013 that Condon would be leaving Munster, to a yet unannounced club.

References

External links
Munster Profile

Living people
1981 births
Rugby union players from County Cork
Irish rugby union players
Dolphin RFC players
Munster Rugby players
Rugby union props